The Queensland Open is a golf tournament held in Queensland, Australia as part of the PGA Tour of Australasia. It was founded in 1925. The event was not held from 2008 to 2012 but returned as a PGA Tour of Australasia event in 2013.

Trophy
The winner receives the T. B. Hunter Cup. The trophy was donated by Thomas Brown Hunter in 1939, the winner to retain it for a year and receive a replica. The trophy was inscribed with the name of the previous winners. Hunter was secretary of Brisbane Golf Club from 1910 to 1938 and also secretary of the Queensland Golf Association. He won the Queensland Amateur Championship in 1913.

History
The first Queensland Open was held at Brisbane Golf Club in June 1925, a 72-hole stroke play event held over two days.  The inaugural event was won by Harry Sinclair, then still an amateur, by 7 strokes from Dick Carr. The Queensland Amateur had previously been held as a stroke play event but in 1925 the format was revised, with the Queensland Open acting as qualifying for the match-play amateur event. Sinclair went on to win the amateur championship the following week.

The event has not always been part of the PGA Tour of Australia's calendar. For example, in 1988 it was not a tour event. Since the 1990s, it has intermittently been an official PGA Tour of Australasia event though also part of the Australian Tour's satellite tours, the Foundation Tour and the Von Nida Tour.

Winners

Source:

Multiple winners
Eleven players have won this tournament more than once through 2020.

7 wins
Norman Von Nida: 1935, 1936, 1937, 1940, 1949, 1953, 1961
5 wins
Eric Cremin: 1946, 1948, 1950, 1956, 1957
4 wins
Bill Dunk: 1972, 1973, 1974, 1980
3 wins
Jim Ferrier: 1934, 1938, 1939
2 wins
Harry Sinclair: 1925, 1931
Ossie Pickworth: 1951, 1952
Kel Nagle: 1959, 1964
Greg Norman: 1983, 1986
David Graham: 1985, 1987
Jeff Senior: 1979, 1992
Terry Price: 1993, 1995

Notes

References

External links
Coverage on Golf Australia official site

PGA Tour of Australasia events
Golf tournaments in Australia
Golf in Queensland
Sports competitions in Queensland